Upper Economy is a rural area of approximately 50 residents and 5 km2 located along Trunk 2 in western Colchester County, Nova Scotia.  It stretches from along the north shoreline of the western end of Cobequid Bay north into the lower slopes of the Cobequid Mountains.  Upper Economy is considered locally to be part of the rural community of Economy.  It borders Little Bass River to the west and the former community of Pleasant Hills to the north.

History
Upper Economy was first settled in 1768 by the Hill brothers, Robert, Charles, and Patrick, who were each allotted in March of that year  of land.

Historically economic activity in Upper Economy was exclusively farming.  Nowadays, there is little farming done.  Some timber and pulp wood harvesting is done as well as weir and clam fishing.

As with much of Colchester County, the original inhabitants Upper Economy of Ulster Scottish origin.  Historically common surnames in the area included Brown, Hill, and Fulton. Lewises who settled here were Scottish.

Sites 
Upper Economy is the location of a Dutch artisan, organic cheesemaker, and a German-style log home manufacturer, both on or next to Brown Road, a road running north-south in the middle of the community.

External links
 Destination: Nova Scotia with a map of Upper Economy

Communities in Colchester County